Salen Chapel is a parish church of the Church of Norway in Namsos municipality in Trøndelag county, Norway. It is located in the village of Salsnes, on the shores of the lake Salsvatnet. It is one of the churches for the Fosnes parish which is part of the Namdal prosti (deanery) in the Diocese of Nidaros. The white, wooden church was built in a long church style in 1953 using plans drawn up by the architect Arne Sørvig. The church seats about 204 people.

History
The parish of Fosnes was served by the Fosnes Church for centuries until 1896 when it burned down. At that time, it was decided to build two new churches to replace it, but neither would be built on the site of the old church. The new chapel was designed by Ole Scheistrøen and it was completed and consecrate in 1900. The chapel was destroyed during World War II and then afterwards in 1953, the present church was built on the same site. It was consecrated in June 1953.

See also
List of churches in Nidaros

References

Namsos
Churches in Trøndelag
Long churches in Norway
Wooden churches in Norway
20th-century Church of Norway church buildings
Churches completed in 1953
1900 establishments in Norway